CIAJ-FM is a Christian radio station that broadcasts at 100.7 FM in Prince Rupert, British Columbia.

Owned by the Aboriginal Christian Voice Network, the station was given approval by the CRTC on October 18, 1999. It ceased broadcasting in 2016.

References

External links
 
 

Iaj
Iaj
Mass media in Prince Rupert, British Columbia
Radio stations established in 2000
2000 establishments in British Columbia